The personal name Dubhghall may refer to:

Dubhghall mac Ruaidhrí
Dubhghall mac Somhairle
Dubhghall mac Suibhne

Irish-language masculine given names